Alexandre-Pierre Gaspar (born 7 April 1960, Paris, France) is a French physician and Internet pioneer, founder in 1996 of COCORICO ! French Culture, Q.O.A.C.H (Question Oriented Approach for Common Health), and later Memento Mundi, a global project aimed to sustain cognitive health.

University
After studies in mathematics, Alexandre-Pierre Gaspar attended in 1979 what was at that time a refuge for multidisciplinary students in Paris: the medical school Necker - Enfants Malades (University of Paris V: René Descartes). He quickly got interested in medical data computing, expert systems and artificial intelligence. He completed several projects with Pr Pierre Debray-Ritzen and Pr Yves Pélicier, neuro-psychiatrists interested by the brain-computer analogy, and finished his research and doctorate work with the authorization of the dean at the Center for Multidisciplinary Studies of Belgrade University, under the direction of Dr Zoran Bozovic, a biophysician member of the DECUS (Digital Equipment Computer User Society). He programmed for that occasion one of the first medical experts systems available on a micro-computer (Apple II), inferring a diagnosis on an electrocardiographic wave.

Nonprofit organization
Dr Alexandre-Pierre Gaspar is one of the founder in 2009 and current president of a nonprofit organization, La Longévité française, aimed  to promote information technology in caregiving of the elderly and training for the cognitively impaired.

Memento Mundi
Memento Mundi is a global project launched in 2011 by Alexandre-Pierre Gaspar to promote cultural tools for caregivers of the cognitively impaired and specific cognitive techniques for everyday life.

References

External links
 Cocorico ! - French Culture)
 Q.O.A.C.H (Question Oriented Approach for Common Health)
 MEMENTO MUNDI - Remarkables Things
 La Longévité française (association) loi 1901

1960 births
Living people
Health informaticians
Information architects